Joseph (Joe) Koenig (born August 14, 1930) is a Canadian filmmaker and entrepreneur who was the founder and president of Electronics Workbench.

Biography
Koenig was born in Dresden, Germany; his family fled Nazi Germany in 1937, emigrating to Canada and settling on a  farm along the Grand River, outside what is now known as Cambridge, Ontario.

National Film Board of Canada
Koenig began his career as a filmmaker in 1956 at the National Film Board of Canada (NFB).  He directed and/or produced 52 films, including Cosmic Zoom, Christopher's Movie Matinée and The Rise and Fall of the Great Lakes. Among his numerous honours, he won two BAFTA awards, for Energy and Matter (1966) and The Rise and Fall of the Great Lakes (1968).

International Cinemedia Center Productions
He left the NFB in 1971 and, with colleagues John Kemeny, George Kaczender and Don Duprey, formed International Cinemedia Center Productions, where he produced educational films and animated content for clients in Canada and the United States, including the celebrated educator Caleb Gattegno.

Interactive Image Technologies
In 1978, International Cinemedia became Alliance Communications (which would become Alliance Atlantis). Koenig left the firm, moved from Montreal to Toronto in and founded Interactive Image Technologies. At the NFB, he had become keenly interested in using multimedia as an educational tool, and focused on producing and distributed educational animated and interactive content and videos. In 1992, the Ontario Government modified its high school curriculum to require the teaching of electronics. A call for proposals to provide a simulation software package to meet the required learning outcomes was issued, and Koenig’s company was awarded the contract.

In 1995, Koenig became embroiled in a copyright lawsuit that gained international attention.  He sued the operator of a website that distributed illegal copies of his software through a bulletin-board and was successful in his lawsuit, which was filed in the UK.

One of the main challenges faced by early versions of Electronics Workbench, was the reluctance of educators to use simulation software as part of their electronics curriculum.  In the early 1990s, there was considerable opposition among the electronics education community regarding the use of simulation software for the delivery of electronics curriculum. Many educators felt that a "hands on" methodology was the only valid method of learning electronics, and that simulation was a less-effective substitute.

In 1996, Koenig approached best-selling author Dr. Colin Simpson,  with the idea of integrating his simulation software with Simpson’s book Principles of Electronics and to offer an Electronics technician program where the entire learning outcomes for laboratory projects would be achieved with simulation. Simpson and Koenig embarked on a series of lectures, conference presentations and meetings with accrediting organizations throughout 1996, where they demonstrated that electronics simulation software could achieve identical results to laboratory experiments performed with real equipment.

The partnership between Koenig and Simpson led to the creation of the Electronics Technician distance education program, which became the largest electronics program in the world.  The program won a National Award in 1998, and established Electronics Workbench as a leading educational resource.

In 1999, Koenig oversaw the acquisition of Ultimate Technology Inc.  (UTI) located in the Netherlands.  The integration of Multisim with UTI’s PCB layout and design, transformed Koenig’s company into a global Electronic Design Automation (EDA) company with an installed base of over 150,000 customers.

Later years
By the year 2000, Koenig’s vision of laboratory simulation software in every school was largely realized and he began to take a more passive role in the strategic planning and day-to-day operation of his company.  He announced his retirement as Chief Executive Officer in 2003, and in 2005, Koenig sold his company to National Instruments.

Filmography
National Film Board of Canada

Radiation - documentary short, Hugh O'Connor 1959 - writer
Life and Radiation - documentary short, Hugh O'Connor 1960 - writer
The Tiny Terrors - documentary short, 1960 - writer and director
Interview with Linus Pauling - documentary, 1960 - director
The Real Story of Radar - documentary short, 1961 writer and director
Mathematics at Your Fingertips - documentary short, John Howe 1961 - producer
The Climates of North America - documentary short, 1962 - writer and director
The Origins of Weather animated short, 1963 - writer and director
Jet Pilot - documentary short, 1964 director
Every Second Car - documentary short, Rex Tasker & Patricia Burwash 1964 - producer
The Rideau: Colonel By's Peaceable Waterway - documentary short, Marc Champion 1964 - producer
Animal Altruism - documentary short, Arthur Lipsett 1965 - producer
Animals and Psychology - documentary short, Arthur Lipsett 1965 - producer
Fear and Horror - documentary short, Arthur Lipsett 1965 - producer
Perceptual Learning - documentary short, Arthur Lipsett 1965 - producer
The Puzzle of Pain - documentary short, Arthur Lipsett 1965 - producer
You Don't Back Down - documentary short, Don Owen 1965 - producer
The Cruise - animated short, John Hubley & Faith Hubley 1966 - producer
Change in the Maritimes - documentary short, Robin Spry 1966 - producer
Change in the Western Mountains - documentary short, 1966 - producer and director
The Changing Wheat Belt - documentary short, 1966 - producer and director
Bird of Passage - documentary short, Martin Defalco 1966 - producer
Energy and Matter - animated short, Robert Verrall 1966 - producer
The Ever-Changing Lowlands - documentary short, Tony Ianzelo 1966 - producer
Restricted Dogs - documentary short, Henry Zemel 1966 - producer
Imperial Sunset - documentary short, Josef Reeve 1967 - producer
Unstructured for a Summer - documentary short, Shelagh Mackenzie 1967 - producer
A Search for Learning - documentary short, Donald Shebib 1967 - producer
Flowers on a One-Way Street - documentary, Robin Spry 1967 - producer
The Rise and Fall of the Great Lakes - documentary short, 1968 Bill Mason - producer
Two Films by Lipsett - experimental short, Donald Rennick 1968 - co-producer with Robert Verrall and Mark Slade
Christopher's Movie Matinée - documentary, Mort Ransen 1968 - producer
Continental Drift - animated short, Co Hoedeman 1968 - producer
Cosmic Zoom - animated short, Robert Verrall 1968 - co-producer with Robert Verrall
If At First… - documentary short, Gilles Gascon 1969 - producer
Bing Bang Boom - documentary short, Joan Henson 1969 - producer
DNA - animated short, Bané Jovanovic 1969 - producer
Falling from Ladders - documentary short, Mort Ransen 1969 - producer
The Half-Masted Schooner - documentary short, Bruce Mackay 1969 - producer
Hymn - experimental short 1969 - producer
The Medium Is the Massage, You Know - documentary short, Trevor Greenwood 1969 - producer
Passing Through Sweden - documentary short, Martin Duckworth 1969 - producer
What Is the Big Complaint? - short film, Salvatore Greco 1969 - producer
What is Life? - animated short 1970 - co-producer with Robert Verrall
Matrioska - animated short, Co Hoedeman 1970 - producer
A Place for Everything - documentary short, 1970 Eric M. Nilsson - producer
Question of Immunity - documentary short, Bané Jovanovic 1971 - producer
Saskatchewan - 45° Below - documentary short, Larry Kent 1971 - producer
What Teacher Expects ... (The Self-fulfilling Prophecy) - documentary short, Barrie McLean & Kristin Weingartner 1971 - producer
The Underground Movie - animated short, Les Drew 1972 - producer
Four Portraits - documentary short, Jim McCammon & Richard Leiterman 1978 - producer
Immigration Law: A Delicate Balance - documentary short, Arnie Gelbart 1978 - producer

Awards
Mathematics at Your Fingertips (1961)
 15th Canadian Film Awards, Montreal: Genie Award for Best Film, Training and Instruction, 1963
 Columbus International Film & Animation Festival, Columbus, Ohio: Chris Certificate, Information/Education, 1964

The Climates of North America (1962)
 Yorkton Film Festival, Yorkton: Golden Sheaf Award, First Prize, Science, 1964
 15th Canadian Film Awards, Montreal: Certificate of Merit, Films for Children, 1963

Jet Pilot (1964)
 Columbus International Film & Animation Festival, Columbus, Ohio: Chris Award, First Prize, Information/Education, 1964

Energy and Matter (1966)
 21st British Academy Film Awards: BAFTA Award for Best Specialised Film, 1968
 International Festival of Didactic Films, Beirut: Gold Medal, 1980
 Roshd International Film Festival, Tehran: Golden Book Trophy - Category: Primary School Film Group, 1993
 Cork International Film Festival, Cork: Certificate of Merit, Scientific and Educational Film, 1966 

Flowers on a One-way Street (1967) 
 Melbourne Film Festival, Melbourne:  Golden Boomerang, Special Prize for Reportage and Style, 1969
 American Film and Video Festival, New York: Blue Ribbon, 1969
 Chicago International Film Festival, Chicago: Gold Hugo for Best Television Film, Local Broadcast, 1968 

Imperial Sunset (1967)
 Adelaide Film Festival, Adelaide: Certificate of Merit, 1969

Christopher's Movie Matinee (1968)
 International Filmfestival Mannheim-Heidelberg, Mannheim: Recommendation of the Adult Education Centres Jury, 1969
 Adelaide Film Festival, Adelaide: Certificate of Merit, 1970

Cosmic Zoom (1968)
 Ibero-American Documentary Film. Festival, Bilbao: Gold Medal, 1969
 Trieste Science+Fiction Festival, Trieste: Golden Seal of the City of Trieste, 1969
 International Educational Film Festival, Tehran: Certificate of Merit, Scientific Films, 1969
 International Exhibition of Scientific Film, Buenos Aires: Diploma of Honor, 1970
 International Festival of Short Films, Philadelphia: Award for Exceptional Merit, 1970
 UNIATEC International Technical Film Competition, Berlin: Award of Excellence 1972 

The Rise and Fall of the Great Lakes (1968)
Yorkton Film Festival, Yorkton: Golden Sheaf Award, First Prize, Educational, 1969
International Educational Film Festival, Tehran: Golden Delfan, First Prize, Scientific Films, 1969
24th British Academy Film Awards, London: Best Specialized Film, 1971
SODRE International Festival of Documentary and Experimental Films, Montevideo: First Place, Documentary 1971
Canadian Amateur Film Association, Montreal: Special Award, Best Film of the Year, 1971
Israeli Film Festival, Tel Aviv: Certificate of Merit, 1969
Canadian Amateur Film Association, Montreal: Certificate of Merit, 1971
International Film Festival on the Human Environment, Montreal: Diploma of Merit, 1973
2nd International Environmental Pollution Exhibition, Winsted, Connecticut: Best Movie, 1975
International Educational Film Festival, Birmingham, Alabama: Electra Award, Business and Industry, 1989

Bing Bang Boom (1969)
 American Film and Video Festival, New York: Blue Ribbon, 1970
 Australian and New Zealand Association for the Advancement of Science (ANZAAS), Sydney: selection for University Exhibition, 1971

Falling from Ladders (1969)
 International Festival of Short Films, Philadelphia: Award for Exceptional Merit, 1971

What is Life? (1970)
 Columbus International Film & Animation Festival, Columbus, Ohio: Chris Award, 1972

Matrioska (1970)
 American Film and Video Festival, New York: Blue Ribbon, 1971

Question of Immunity (1971)
 Golden Gate International Film Festival, San Francisco: Best Film. Medical and Health, 1972

The Underground Movie (1972)
 Adelaide Film Festival, Adelaide: Certificate of Merit, 1974

References

National Film Board of Canada people
Canadian documentary film directors
Film directors from Ontario
Canadian cinematographers
Canadian documentary film producers
Living people
1930 births
People from Dresden
German emigrants to Canada
People from the Regional Municipality of Waterloo